Puerto Rico Highway 119 (PR-119) is a long north-to-south highway in Puerto Rico that goes from Puerto Rico Highway 2 in Hatillo, close to its border with Camuy to the same highway in San Germán. It goes through the municipalities of Camuy, San Sebastián, Las Marías and Maricao before ending in the freeway segment of PR-2. Between Camuy and San Sebastián it passes near Guajataca Lake, the largest artificial lake in western Puerto Rico.

Major intersections

Related route

Puerto Rico Highway 4119 (PR-4119) is the old section of PR-485 through Camuy, Puerto Rico. It is a parallel road to the Atlantic coast that runs from downtown Camuy to the Quebradillas municipal limit.

See also

 List of highways numbered 119

References

External links

 Carretera 119, San Germán, Puerto Rico

119